At the 2011 Pan Arab Games, the goalball events were held at Al Sadd Sports Club in Doha, Qatar from 13–20 December. A total of 11 teams played with only a men's tournament played.

Results

Tournament Results

Group stage

Group A

Group B

Tournament bracket

Final standing

References

External links
Goalball at official website

Events at the 2011 Pan Arab Games